Elections to Magherafelt District Council were held on 5 May 2011 on the same day as the other Northern Irish local government elections. The election used three district electoral areas to elect a total of 16 councillors.

Election results

Note: "Votes" are the first preference votes.

Districts summary

|- class="unsortable" align="centre"
!rowspan=2 align="left"|Ward
! % 
!Cllrs
! % 
!Cllrs
! %
!Cllrs
! %
!Cllrs
! % 
!Cllrs
!rowspan=2|TotalCllrs
|- class="unsortable" align="center"
!colspan=2 bgcolor="" | Sinn Féin
!colspan=2 bgcolor="" | DUP
!colspan=2 bgcolor="" | SDLP
!colspan=2 bgcolor="" | UUP
!colspan=2 bgcolor="white"| Others
|-
|align="left"|Magherafelt Town
|bgcolor="#008800"|41.4
|bgcolor="#008800"|3
|22.3
|1
|17.7
|1
|10.2
|1
|8.4
|0
|6
|-
|align="left"|Moyola
|bgcolor="#008800"|48.0
|bgcolor="#008800"|3
|17.1
|1
|8.6
|0
|11.2
|1
|15.1
|0
|5
|-
|align="left"|Sperrin
|bgcolor="#008800"|55.6
|bgcolor="#008800"|3
|9.7
|1
|20.6
|1
|8.3
|0
|5.8
|0
|5
|- class="unsortable" class="sortbottom" style="background:#C9C9C9"
|align="left"| Total
|48.4
|9
|16.3
|3
|15.9
|2
|9.8
|2
|9.6
|0
|16
|-
|}

District results

Magherafelt Town

2005: 2 x Sinn Féin, 2 x DUP, 1 x SDLP, 1 x UUP
2011: 3 x Sinn Féin, 1 x DUP, 1 x SDLP, 1 x UUP
2005-2011 Change: Sinn Féin gain from DUP

Moyola

2005: 3 x Sinn Féin, 1 x DUP, 1 x UUP
2011: 3 x Sinn Féin, 1 x DUP, 1 x UUP
2005-2011 Change: No change

Sperrin

2005: 3 x Sinn Féin, 1 x SDLP, 1 x DUP
2011: 3 x Sinn Féin, 1 x SDLP, 1 x DUP
2005-2011 Change: No change

References

Magherafelt District Council elections
Magherafelt